Denys Serhiyovych Balanyuk (born 16 January 1997) is a Ukrainian professional footballer who plays as a striker for Bulgarian club Spartak Varna.

Career
Balanyuk is a product of the sports school ♯11 in Odesa. His first trainer was Anatoliy Matsanskyi. At his 15 he joined FC Dnipro academy.

He made his debut for FC Dnipro in the match against FC Shakhtar Donetsk on 23 May 2015 in the Ukrainian Premier League.

Balanyuk scored 2 goals early in the first half for his 1st league start and 3rd appearance for Dnipro in a 5–0 win over Volyn Lutsk on July 24.

On 9 September 2017 he signed a contract with Wisła Kraków. On 29 June 2018 he was loaned to Ukrainian Premier League club Arsenal Kyiv.

International career
Balanyuk was named in the preliminary 31-players senior national squad for the 2018 FIFA World Cup qualification match against Iceland on 5 September 2016.

References

External links

1997 births
Living people
Footballers from Odesa
Ukraine youth international footballers
Ukraine under-21 international footballers
Ukrainian footballers
Association football forwards
FC Dnipro players
Wisła Kraków players
FC Arsenal Kyiv players
FC Olimpik Donetsk players
FC Torpedo Moscow players
IFK Mariehamn players
PFC Spartak Varna players
Ukrainian Premier League players
Ekstraklasa players
Russian First League players
Veikkausliiga players
Ukrainian expatriate footballers
Expatriate footballers in Poland
Ukrainian expatriate sportspeople in Poland
Expatriate footballers in Russia
Ukrainian expatriate sportspeople in Russia
Expatriate footballers in Finland
Ukrainian expatriate sportspeople in Finland
Expatriate footballers in Bulgaria
Ukrainian expatriate sportspeople in Bulgaria
Dnipro Academy people